Hesar Mehtar may refer to:

Hesar Mehtar, Pakdasht
Hesar Mehtar, Robat Karim